CBHS may refer to:

Canterbury Boys' High School, Australia
Christian Brothers High School (disambiguation), many schools in various locations
Christchurch Boys' High School, New Zealand
Christies Beach High School, Australia
Cocoa Beach High School, Florida
Cypress Bay High School, Florida